Yuxarı Öysüzlü (also, Yuxarı Öksüzlü, Yukary-Oysyuzlyu, Yukhary Oysyuzlyu, and Yukhary-Oksyuzlyu) is a village and municipality in the Tovuz Rayon of Azerbaijan.  It has a population of 5,763.

References 

Populated places in Tovuz District